Cho Jung-tai (born 22 January 1959) is a Taiwanese politician. He served on the Taipei City Council from 1990 to 1998, when he was first elected to the Legislative Yuan. Cho remained a legislator through 2004, when he was appointed deputy secretary-general to the president during the Chen Shui-bian administration. During Frank Hsieh's 2008 presidential bid, Cho assumed the post of Secretary-General of the Democratic Progressive Party. He returned to public service in 2017, as secretary-general of the Executive Yuan under Premier William Lai. In 2019, Cho succeeded Tsai Ing-wen as leader of the Democratic Progressive Party. He remained leader of the party until May 2020, when Tsai resumed the role.

Early life and education
Cho was born in Taipei, Taiwan. He obtained his bachelor's degree in law from National Chung Hsing University.

Political career
Cho was a member of the Kuomintang. Cho launched his career in politics as a city council aide to Frank Hsieh during his tenure in the Taipei City Council. He was later elected as member of the Taipei City Council from 1990 to 1998. Following two terms as city councillor, Cho was elected to the Legislative Yuan in 1998 and 2001. He vacated the position in May 2004, succeeding Chen Che-nan as deputy secretary-general to President Chen Shui-bian. He was appointed spokesperson of the Executive Yuan in January 2005. In January 2006, Cho resumed his previous post as deputy-secretary general within the presidential office. Cho was appointed Secretary-General of the Democratic Progressive Party in October 2007. He was replaced shortly following Frank Hsieh's loss in the presidential elections in March 2008.

Cho was appointed Secretary-General of the Executive Yuan in September 2017, and took office with the inauguration of the William Lai cabinet. In December 2018, Cho announced his intention to contest the DPP chairmanship vacated by Tsai Ing-wen after the DPP's landslide defeat in the local elections of 2018. The leadership election was held on 6 January 2019. During the contest, Cho received support from party heavyweights among the "middle generation" or "Wild Lily generation," including endorsements from Cheng Wen-tsan, Lin Chia-lung, Chen Chi-mai, Huang Wei-cher, Lin Chih-chien, Weng Chang-liang and Pan Men-an. The Democratic Progressive Party reported that voter turnout was 16.9%. Cho won 24,699 votes total, and 72.6% of all votes cast. Cho took office on 9 January 2019, when the electoral results were formally announced. Cho stepped down from the chairmanship on 20 May 2020, as Tsai Ing-wen was inaugurated for a second presidential term.

References

|-

|-

|-

|-

1959 births
Democratic Progressive Party Members of the Legislative Yuan
Living people
Politicians of the Republic of China on Taiwan from Keelung
Taipei Members of the Legislative Yuan
Members of the 4th Legislative Yuan
Members of the 5th Legislative Yuan
National Chung Hsing University alumni
Taipei City Councilors